The Mexican is a 2001 American dark comedy adventure crime film directed by Gore Verbinski and stars Julia Roberts and Brad Pitt in lead roles. Its plot is a mixture of different genres.

Plot
In Los Angeles, a traffic light changes to red and there are offscreen sounds of an automobile collision.

Five years later, Jerry Welbach has been working off a debt to imprisoned mob boss Arnold Margolese. After Jerry fouls up what was meant to be his final errand, Margolese's second-in-command, Bernie Nayman sends Jerry on a new final errand: retrieving an antique pistol for Margolese in Mexico from a man named Beck. Jerry's additional job for Margolese proves to be the last straw for Jerry's girlfriend Sam, who leaves him to move to Las Vegas.

Arriving in Mexico, Jerry finds the pistol with Beck, who explains the history of the legendary gun known as "the Mexican". When Beck is killed by a stray bullet from celebratory gunfire, Jerry calls his colleague Ted and learns that Beck was Margolese's grandson. Just then, Jerry's car is stolen, with Beck's body and the pistol inside. Jerry recovers the car and the gun, shooting one of the thieves in the foot and burying the body.

En route to Las Vegas, a well-dressed hitman tries to abduct Sam, but is shot by another hitman who captures her instead. The second hitman introduces himself as Leroy, explaining that he was hired to hold Sam hostage to ensure Jerry delivers the pistol.

Sam explains to Leroy that Jerry became indebted to Margolese five years ago, after crashing into Margolese's car, while running a red light. This was the accident heard at the beginning of the film. The police discovered someone tied up in Margolese's trunk that he intended to kill. Margolese was sent to prison for five years and Jerry was forced to run errands for Margolese for that same period.

Bonding with Leroy, Sam deduces that he is gay and encourages him to pick up Frank, a traveling postal worker. The three of them reach Las Vegas, and Leroy and Frank spend the night together.

In Mexico, Jerry is briefly arrested after a police officer notices Beck's blood in his car. Confiscating the pistol, the officer elaborates on its cursed history and takes it to a pawn shop. Ted arrives and reveals that the infamous Leroy has been sent after Sam. Jerry overhears a call with Nayman ordering Ted to kill him. They recover the pistol from the pawn shop, but Jerry confronts Ted and leaves with the gun. Realizing he grabbed Ted's passport instead of his own, he returns to find Ted has already fled.

In Las Vegas, the well-dressed hitman murders the innocent Frank and returns for Sam, but is killed by a vengeful Leroy. Sam and Leroy fly to Mexico to meet Jerry, who crashes the car in an argument with Sam. Leroy finds the pistol and prepares to kill Jerry, but Jerry kills him first. He explains to a distraught Sam that Leroy was an imposter – his driver’s license reveals he is actually Winston Baldry – and that Jerry once met the real Leroy: the well-dressed hitman. Jerry realizes that Margolese hired the real Leroy, but Nayman sent Baldry to intercept Sam and the pistol, allowing him to sell it himself and frame Jerry.

Sam and Jerry prepare to go their separate ways, but Sam remembers Baldry's advice to never give up when you truly love someone, and reconciles with Jerry. Soon after, Jerry gets kidnapped by the thieves who stole his car. He is brought to Margolese, newly released from prison, who explains the true story of the pistol: it was crafted by a gunsmith for his daughter's marriage to a nobleman's cruel son, but the daughter and the gunsmith's assistant were truly in love. When the gun refused to fire for the nobleman's son, he killed the assistant, leading the daughter to take her own life with the pistol.

Margolese reveals that his cellmate was the gunsmith's great-grandson; he was killed protecting Margolese, who swore to return the pistol to his cellmate's father. Jerry agrees to give him the pistol, but Nayman kidnaps Sam. A Mexican standoff ensues, until Sam kills Nayman with the pistol; the shot dislodges a ring from the gunbarrel, which Jerry uses to propose to Sam. The Mexican pistol is restored to the gunsmith's family, as Jerry and Sam drive off together.

Cast
 Julia Roberts as Samantha Barzel
 Brad Pitt as Jerry Welbach
 James Gandolfini as Leroy
 J. K. Simmons as Ted Slocum
 Bob Balaban as Bernie Nayman
 Sherman Augustus as Well Dressed Black Man
 Michael Cerveris as Frank
 David Krumholtz as Beck
 Castulo Guerra as Joe, The Pawnshop Owner
 Gene Hackman as Arnold Margolese

Production

Pre-production
The script was originally intended to be filmed as an independent production without major motion picture stars, but Roberts and Pitt, who had for some time been looking for a project they could do together, decided to make it, following Roberts' introduction and encouragement of the project to Pitt.  Roberts also suggested the casting of James Gandolfini, in what is regarded as one of his greatest roles.

Kevin Reynolds and David Fincher were both considered to direct. Reynolds turned it down because no cast was confirmed, and Fincher was too busy with the release of Fight Club. Ben Stiller and Meg Ryan had both expressed interest in the lead roles.

Filming

The Mexican made use of Real de Catorce, San Luis Potosí, Mexico, as a film location, as well as various areas in Las Vegas, Nevada and Los Angeles, California. Aeropuerto internacional Adolfo Lopez Mateos Toluca, Estado de México was used as well.

Reception

Box office
The film opened at #1 at the North American box office making $20,108,829 USD in its opening weekend, although the film had a 39% decline in earnings the following week, it was enough to keep the film at the top spot for another week. Ultimately, the film earned $147.8 million worldwide.

Critical reception
The film holds a 54% rating on Rotten Tomatoes from 133 critics, with an average rating of 5.6/10. The critical consensus states that "Though The Mexican makes a good attempt at originality, its ponderous length makes it wear out its welcome. Also, those looking forward to seeing Roberts and Pitt paired up may end up disappointed, as they are kept apart for most of the movie." On Metacritic, the film has a score of 43 out of 100, based on 35 critics, indicating "mixed or average reviews". Audiences polled by CinemaScore gave the film an average grade of "C" on an A+ to F scale.

"The scenes between Roberts and Gandolfini make the film special. ... Their dialogue scenes are the best reason to see the film."

"Pitt and Roberts are good too – maybe better like this than if they were together. ... If it had been a Pitt/Roberts two-hander, there wouldn't have been room for Gandolfini's wonderful character, and that would have been a shame."

"The Mexican is sporadically entertaining. It works when Gandolfini is on screen; when he leaves, he takes the movie with him. ... From here, director Gore Verbinski, intercuts between two road movies, one of which (the one with Pitt) is downright boring".

"Roberts and Pitt are generally terrific. In The Mexican they are horrid. ... Gandolfini is a star on the rise. His work in The Mexican is solid. Frankly, he's the only bright spot in this dark and pointless movie."

"Moviegoers who have seen The Mexican aren't coming out of cinemas talking about the romantic chemistry between Brad Pitt and Julia Roberts. They're talking about the presence of tough guy James Gandolfini in the unlikely role of a gay hit man named Leroy."

References

External links

 
 
 
 

2001 films
2000s adventure comedy films
2000s crime comedy films
2001 LGBT-related films
2001 romantic comedy films
2000s comedy road movies
American adventure comedy films
American crime comedy films
American LGBT-related films
American romantic comedy films
American comedy road movies
DreamWorks Pictures films
Films directed by Gore Verbinski
Films produced by Lawrence Bender
Films scored by Alan Silvestri
Films set in the Las Vegas Valley
Films set in Mexico
Films shot in the Las Vegas Valley
Films shot in Los Angeles
Films shot in Mexico
LGBT-related comedy films
Newmarket films
2000s English-language films
2000s American films